Dale Church is a parish church of the Church of Norway in Vaksdal Municipality in Vestland county, Norway. It is located in the village of Dale. It is the church for the Dale parish which is part of the Hardanger og Voss prosti (deanery) in the Diocese of Bjørgvin. The white, concrete church was built in a long church design in 1956 using plans drawn up by the architect Arnstein Arneberg. The church seats about 600 people.

History
In 1895, plans were made to build a chapel in the village of Dale. Peter and Jens Jebsen wrote a letter to the municipal council that Dale Fabrikker, a local industrial business, would pay for the upkeep of the new chapel. Johannes Haldorsen was hired to build the chapel. On 16 July 1896, King Oscar II visited Dale and saw the chapel as it was being built. The new chapel was consecrated on 15 November 1896 by the Bishop Waldemar Hvoslef. The chapel was built in a neo-Gothic style and had 380 seats, including the second floor seating gallery. In 1916, electric lights were installed in the building.

By the 1930s, it was noted that the chapel was too small for the village. Planning for a new, larger church began in the 1930s. Arnstein Arneberg won the architectural competition to design the new church. Work on this stopped for many years due to World War II, but in 1947, Arneberg delivered his drawings for the new church. It wasn't until September 1953, that a building permit was granted. The old chapel was torn down and its materials were sold. The groundbreaking ceremony for the new church was held in 1954 and it was completed in 1956. The new church was consecrated on 16 December 1956.

Media gallery

See also
List of churches in Bjørgvin

References

Vaksdal
Churches in Vestland
Long churches in Norway
Concrete churches in Norway
20th-century Church of Norway church buildings
Churches completed in 1956
1896 establishments in Norway